Stalin Sivadas is a 1999 Malayalam political conspiracy crime film, directed by T. S. Suresh Babu and written by T. Damodaran. The film stars  Mammootty, Madhu,Jagadish, Khushbu, Captain Raju, Nedumudi Venu, Maniyanpilla Raju, and Shankar.The film . The film released alongside Pathram.

Plot
A story about communist party's and BJS's political violence in Kerala and its roots as influences of foreign conspirators like Moral Re-Armament.

Cast 

Mammootty as Sivadas alias Stalin Sivadas
Madhu as Chief Minister Krishnan Nair
Jagadish as Vishwam
Khushbu as Dr.Manju
Suresh Gopi  as Dr.Manju's Brother (Photo Archieve) 
Captain Raju as Contractor Narendran
N. F. Varghese as Anandan
Nedumudi Venu as CG
Sai Kumar as Commissioner Sarathchandran IPS
Shankar as BSS loyalist Jayachandran
Maniyanpilla Raju as Mayor Anto
Babu Namboothiri as Madhavan Nair
Sreejaya Nair as Indu Jayachandran, Sivadas's sister
Kozhikode Narayanan Nair as Party Veteran Leader Luckose
Chandni Shaju as Ammini
Anil Murali as Xavier
Abu Salim as Keshu
Madhupal as Sukumaran
James as Sugunan
Jagannathan as Keshavan Pillai
KPAC Azeez as Interviewer DD
Kaladi Omana as Sharada
Shivaji as SI Thankachan
Kanakalatha as Sarahemma
Poojappura Ravi as Leader's PA Nambiar
Yamuna as Sreekala Menon
Ravi Vallathol as Manoj
T. P. Madhavan as Leader
Kottayam Shantha as Manju's mother
Keerikkadan Jose as BSS Leader
N. N. Ilayathu as Nithyananda Swami
Aliyar as Divakaran

Soundtrack 
 Rakthavarnna Kodi Pongi...K.J.Yeshudas
 Lyrics and Music : M.G. Radhakrishnan

References

External links 
 
 https://archive.today/20130218004718/http://popcorn.oneindia.in/title/5352/ezhupunna-tharakan.html

1999 films
1990s Malayalam-language films
Films directed by T. S. Suresh Babu